Basil Glenn Wilkerson (January 22, 1907 – September 2, 1967) was an American football offensive lineman in the National Football League (NFL) for the Boston Braves, Staten Island Stapletons, and the Cincinnati Reds.  He played college football at Oklahoma City University.

Early life
Wilkerson was born in Duncan, Oklahoma and attended Duncan High School.

College career
Wilkerson attended and played college football at Oklahoma City University.  He was part of the Oklahoma City Stars football team that went undefeated in 1931.  After the season, Wilkerson played in the East–West Shrine Game.

Professional career
After college, Wilkerson played in the National Football League (NFL) for the Boston Braves, Staten Island Stapletons, and the Cincinnati Reds.

After football
Wilkerson and his family moved to Odessa, Texas and he became a member of the Odessa College board of regents.  He died of a heart attack on September 2, 1967.

References

External links
 
 

1907 births
1967 deaths
People from Duncan, Oklahoma
Players of American football from Oklahoma
Oklahoma City Chiefs football players
American football offensive linemen
Boston Braves (NFL) players
Staten Island Stapletons players
Cincinnati Reds (NFL) players